George Ogbeide (born 4 August 1968 in Lagos) is a retired Nigerian long jumper. He won the silver medal at the 1991 Summer Universiade and the gold at the 1991 All-Africa Games.

Ogbeide finished fourth in 4 x 100 metres relay at the 1991 World Championships with teammates Olapade Adeniken, Victor Omagbemi and Davidson Ezinwa.

His personal best jump was 8.24 metres, achieved in July 1991 in Cottbus. This ranks him fourth among Nigerian long jumpers, behind Yusuf Alli (8.27 m), Charlton Ehizuelen (8.26 m indoor) and Paul Emordi (8.25 m). 

Ogbeide also won the 1991 American collegiate (NCAA) long jump title with a leap of 8.13 metres.

Achievements

External links

1968 births
Living people
Nigerian male sprinters
Nigerian male long jumpers
Sportspeople from Lagos
African Games gold medalists for Nigeria
African Games medalists in athletics (track and field)
Universiade medalists in athletics (track and field)
Athletes (track and field) at the 1991 All-Africa Games
Universiade silver medalists for Nigeria
Medalists at the 1991 Summer Universiade
Washington State University alumni
20th-century Nigerian people